The 1937 Minnesota Golden Gophers football team represented the University of Minnesota in the 1937 Big Ten Conference football season. In their sixth year under head coach Bernie Bierman, the Golden Gophers compiled a 6–2 record and outscored their opponents by a combined total of 184 to 50.

End Ray King was named an All-American by the Walter Camp Football Foundation and Look magazine. Fullback Andy Uram was named an All-American by the Associated Press. King, halfback Rudy Gmitro, tackle Lou Midler and guard Frank Twedell were named All-Big Ten first team.

Rudy Gmitro was awarded the Team MVP Award.

Total attendance for the season was 254,188, which averaged to 50,838. The season high for attendance was against Notre Dame.

Schedule

References

Minnesota
Minnesota Golden Gophers football seasons
Big Ten Conference football champion seasons
Minnesota Golden Gophers football